Flisa Idrettslag is an alliance sports club based in Flisa, Åsnes, Norway.

It has sections for football (soccer) and team handball, and was founded in 1971.

The men's football team plays in the Third Division. They won their section in both 2008 and 2009, and both times wound up in promotion playoffs. The team lost 2-3 on aggregate both times; first to FF Lillehammer and the second time to Brumunddal.

External links

Football clubs in Norway
Sport in Hedmark
Åsnes
Association football clubs established in 1971
1971 establishments in Norway